Michihisa Onoda (born 31 January 1978) is a former Japanese tennis player.

Onoda has a career high ATP singles ranking of 301 achieved on 11 October 2004. He also has a career high ATP doubles ranking of 306 achieved on 26 April 2004.

Onoda has 1 ATP Challenger Tour title at the 2003 Busan Open.

External links

1978 births
Living people
Japanese male tennis players
Asian Games medalists in tennis
Asian Games gold medalists for Japan
Asian Games silver medalists for Japan
Asian Games bronze medalists for Japan
Tennis players at the 1998 Asian Games
Tennis players at the 2002 Asian Games
Medalists at the 1998 Asian Games
Medalists at the 2002 Asian Games
Universiade medalists in tennis
Universiade bronze medalists for Japan
Medalists at the 1999 Summer Universiade
20th-century Japanese people
21st-century Japanese people